Yves Niaré (20 July 1977 – 5 December 2012) was a shot putter from France.

Career
Niaré was born in Saint-Maurice, Val-de-Marne. He father was Malian shot putter Namakoro Niaré. His main honor was the silver medal at the 2009 European Indoor Championships with a throw of 20.42 metres. He also finished eleventh at the 1996 World Junior Championships, and fourth at the 2009 Mediterranean Games.

Niaré competed at the 2001 World Championships, the 2006 European Championships, the 2007 World Championships, the 2008 Olympic Games and the 2009 World Championships without reaching the final.

His personal best throw in the shot put was 20.72 metres, a French national record, achieved in May 2008 in Versailles. He also had 63.44 metres in the discus throw, achieved in May 2007 in Chelles.

He was the brother of French High Jumper Gaëlle Niaré.

Death
Niaré was killed on the morning of 5 December 2012 in an automobile accident. A statement regarding his death was issued by the French Athletics Federation. He was 35.

Competition record

References

External links 
 

1977 births
2012 deaths
People from Saint-Maurice, Val-de-Marne
Sportspeople from Val-de-Marne
French people of Malian descent
French male shot putters
French male discus throwers
Athletes (track and field) at the 2008 Summer Olympics
Olympic athletes of France
Athletes (track and field) at the 2001 Mediterranean Games
Athletes (track and field) at the 2009 Mediterranean Games
Mediterranean Games competitors for France
Road incident deaths in France